Harold Arroyo (born February 18, 1961) is a retired boxer from Puerto Rico. He won the silver medal in the Men's Super Heavyweight (+ 91 kg) division at the 1991 Pan American Games. Arroyo also represented his native country at the 1988 Summer Olympics, where he was defeated in the second round by Poland's Janusz Zarenkiewicz.

References
sports-reference

1961 births
Living people
Heavyweight boxers
Olympic boxers of Puerto Rico
Boxers at the 1988 Summer Olympics
Boxers at the 1991 Pan American Games
Puerto Rican male boxers
Pan American Games silver medalists for Puerto Rico
Pan American Games medalists in boxing
Medalists at the 1991 Pan American Games
Central American and Caribbean Games silver medalists for Puerto Rico
Competitors at the 1990 Central American and Caribbean Games
Competitors at the 1993 Central American and Caribbean Games
Central American and Caribbean Games medalists in boxing